Coleophora megaloptila is a moth of the family Coleophoridae, found in South Africa.

References

Endemic moths of South Africa
megaloptila
Moths described in 1909
Moths of Africa